METU Science and Technology Museum is a museum established within the campus of the Middle East Technical University, Ankara, 
Turkey. The museum is aimed to present the modern technological tools as well as technological past of Turkey.

Construction 
The steel carrier system has been used in the construction of the complex which had begun in 2002. Although the planned complex hasn't been finished yet, the museum was opened to public in 2005. When completed, in addition to  open space exhibit area, the total closed  area will be   . The closed area consists of 
Main hall (also called main silo), 
Glass hall for receptions and markets, 
Supplementary building (also called hangar), 
Audio-visual hall

There will also be a pond and an amphitheatre.

The exhibited items
Locomotives, and aircraft such as the C-47 and F-104 are exhibited in the open space area. In the closed area there are test sets for interactive training . The items of historical importance are supplied by the Ministry of Culture One of the most notable items is known as Ecevit's typewriter a typewriter contributed by the late Bülent Ecevit, a former prime minister who was a journalist prior to his political service and always preferred his 70-year-old Erica typewriter.

References

External links
 ODTÜ Bilim ve Teknoloji Müzesi
 Photogallery

Museums in Ankara
Science and technology museums in Turkey
Middle East Technical University
Museums established in 2003
University museums in Turkey
2003 establishments in Turkey